Luka Kačavenda (born 1 November 2001) is a Bosnian professional footballer who plays as a goalkeeper for Bosnian Premier League club Velež Mostar.

Club career
Kačavenda made two appearances for Radnik Bijeljina in the 2020–21 Bosnian Cup, including a match against fellow Bosnian Premier League side Tuzla City, which finished as a 1–3 loss. On 23 January 2021, he joined Olimpik.

On 18 June 2021, Kačavenda signed a one-year contract with Velež Mostar. He debuted for Velež in a league game against Posušje on 19 July 2021.

International career
Kačavenda represented Bosnia and Herzegovina on various youth levels.

References

External links

Radnik Bijeljina statistics

2001 births
Living people
People from Prijedor
Bosnia and Herzegovina footballers
Bosnia and Herzegovina youth international footballers
Bosnia and Herzegovina expatriate footballers
Bosnia and Herzegovina expatriate sportspeople in Serbia
Expatriate footballers in Serbia
Association football goalkeepers
FK Radnik Bijeljina players
FK Olimpik players
FK Velež Mostar players